Rent (Original Broadway Cast Recording) is an album of music from the Tony Award- and Pulitzer Prize-winning 1996 musical Rent. It is produced by DreamWorks with music and lyrics by Jonathan Larson. The album is a 2-disc (in its CD format) collection of every song from the musical; some small segments of narration and spoken dialogue from the play are not included in the recording. The collection ends with a studio-recorded rearrangement of the song "Seasons of Love" featuring Stevie Wonder. The album was recorded by the original Broadway cast of RENT and was released on August 27, 1996. A second one-disc album was released in 1999 containing highlights from the original cast album.

Track listing

Original Broadway Cast Recording

The Best of Rent: Highlights From The Original Cast Album
 "Rent" - Anthony Rapp, Adam Pascal, Daphne Rubin-Vega, Jesse L. Martin, Idina Menzel, Fredi Walker, Taye Diggs
 "One Song Glory" - Adam Pascal
 "Light My Candle" - Adam Pascal, Daphne Rubin-Vega
 "Today 4 U" - Wilson Jermaine Heredia, Jesse L. Martin, Anthony Rapp, Adam Pascal
 "Tango: Maureen" - Anthony Rapp, Fredi Walker
 "Life Support" - Wilson Jermaine Heredia, Jesse L. Martin, Anthony Rapp, Adam Pascal, Gilles Chiasson, Timothy Britten Parker, Rodney Hicks
 "Out Tonight" - Daphne Rubin-Vega
 "Another Day" - Adam Pascal, Daphne Rubin-Vega
 "Will I?" - Gilles Chiasson, Wilson Jermaine Heredia, Jesse L. Martin, Anthony Rapp, Adam Pascal
 "Santa Fe" - Wilson Jermaine Heredia, Jesse L. Martin, Anthony Rapp, Adam Pascal
 "I'll Cover You" - Wilson Jermaine Heredia, Jesse L. Martin
 "La Vie Bohème" - Anthony Rapp, Adam Pascal, Daphne Rubin-Vega, Jesse L. Martin, Wilson Jermaine Heredia, Idina Menzel, Fredi Walker, Taye Diggs
 "I Should Tell You" - Adam Pascal, Daphne Rubin-Vega
 "La Vie Bohème B" - Anthony Rapp, Adam Pascal, Daphne Rubin-Vega, Jesse L. Martin, Wilson Jermaine Heredia, Idina Menzel, Fredi Walker
 "Seasons of Love" - Anthony Rapp, Adam Pascal, Daphne Rubin-Vega, Jesse L. Martin, Wilson Jermaine Heredia, Idina Menzel, Fredi Walker, Taye Diggs, Gwen Stewart, Byron Utley
 "Take Me or Leave Me" - Idina Menzel, Fredi Walker
 "Without You" - Daphne Ruben-Vega, Adam Pascal
 "I'll Cover You (Reprise)" - Jesse L. Martin, Fredi Walker, Anthony Rapp, Adam Pascal, Idina Menzel, Daphne Rubin-Vega, Taye Diggs
 "What You Own" - Anthony Rapp, Adam Pascal
 "Finale B" - Daphne Rubin-Vega, Adam Pascal, Fredi Walker, Idina Menzel, Jesse L. Martin, Anthony Rapp
 "Seasons of Love (Arif Mardin's Remix)" - Anthony Rapp, Adam Pascal, Daphne Rubin-Vega, Jesse L. Martin, Wilson Jermaine Heredia, Idina Menzel, Fredi Walker, Taye Diggs, Gwen Stewart, Byron Utley

See also 
 Rent: Original Motion Picture Soundtrack

References 

Cast recordings
1996 soundtrack albums
1999 soundtrack albums
Theatre soundtracks
DreamWorks Records soundtracks
Works based on Scenes of Bohemian Life
LGBT-related albums